Banksville Records is an independent record label based in Vercelli, Italy and London, England.

Company history
Banksville Records is a recording company founded in 2005 by producer Paolo Baltaro, awarded as winners of the 12th "Tribute to Demetrio Stratos", the "Darwin award for Italian non-conventional music in 2008 and, as producer, he was awarded as winner of the 2010 edition of the Prog Award as Best 2010 Production for Weather Underground.
Exclusive holder of Rewave System technology. Distribution: Audioglobe

Signed artists
Arcansiel, Endless Pain,Fabrizio Consoli, Mhmm, Società Anonima Decostruzionismi Organici, Toxic Poison, Paolo Baltaro, Terry Dene, Gabriel Delta and the Hurricanes, Maimale, Black Monday, Sorella Maldestra, Cesare Bardelli, Sandro Marinoni

References

External links
 Official website
 Kmp-Pkm group

Record labels established in 2005
Alternative rock record labels
Jazz record labels